Blake Michael (born July 31, 1996) is an American actor, journalist, and businessman. He is perhaps best known for his role as Charlie Delgado in the Disney Channel original movie Lemonade Mouth (2011), as well as for his role as Tyler James in the Disney Channel series Dog with a Blog (2012–2015), which earned him the 2013 Young Artist Award for Best Leading Young Actor in a Television Series. In 2021, Michael became the Chief Evangelist of Lumanu, a social media management company aimed at helping online creators manage their brand and business. That same year, he began writing for Forbes as a marketing expert and business analyst.

Life and career
Michael was born in Atlanta, Georgia, and is of Puerto Rican and Russian Jewish descent. Michael's career as a child actor began at the age of three, when he started booking print ad jobs. Michael enrolled at the Company Acting Studio in Atlanta at the age of five, and was discovered by a talent agent when he was six. His first commercial role was for Bojangles' Famous Chicken, alongside NFL quarterback Jake Delhomme. At age ten, he was chosen to host of a series of four commercials for Hasbro Toys that would air on Cartoon Network. After the ad campaign, Cartoon Network invited Michael to present and host his own show on the network, which culminated in two shows named Fried Dynamite, which aired on Fridays, and Dynamite Action Squad! on Saturdays.

In May 2010, Blake appeared in No Limit Kids: Much Ado About Middle School and later joined with the film's star, country singer Celeste Kellogg, to create and sing a duet titled "Looking In Your Eyes". He made a small cameo in Kellogg's music video "My Jeans". In June 2010, he was discovered in an open casting call and was cast in a co-lead role as Charlie Delgado in the Disney Channel made-for-TV movie musical Lemonade Mouth. Michael later called this role the one that "catapulted his career" and "helped him gain an audience". Soon after, Disney approached Michael and asked him to read for a role on an upcoming sitcom. Michael later accepted the role as Tyler James in the Disney Channel sitcom Dog with a Blog, who he portrayed from 2012 to 2015.

As a director, Michael directed the short film Anonymous in 2011, and Notes of Hers in 2013, the latter of which was featured at the Toronto Student Film Festival, and won the Audience Choice Award at the Red Rock Film Festival. In 2015, he appeared as Chase in the Lifetime television movie I Killed My BFF. In 2018, he voiced Curtis in eight episodes of Voltron: Legendary Defender. In 2019, he was featured as Pete in Princess of the Row, which premiered at the Cinequest Film Festival.

In 2021, Michael joined the board of directors of Lumanu, a social media management company, as the Chief Evangelist. He was inspired to help other creators elevate their social status on the internet instead of following what he called the "traditional Hollywood film route", using experience he gained from becoming one of the first and youngest people to be officially partnered with YouTube from a young age. He also began writing for Forbes as a marketing expert, and to promote Lumanu's services, that same year.

Filmography

Film

Television

Director

Awards

References

External links
Official website

1996 births
21st-century American male actors
Male actors from Georgia (U.S. state)
Male actors from Atlanta
American male child actors
American male film actors
American male television actors
American people of Russian-Jewish descent
Hispanic and Latino American male actors
Living people
21st-century American singers
21st-century American male singers